Cai Changgui (born 15 April 1983) is a Chinese goalball player. He won a gold medal at the 2008 Summer Paralympics.

He competed in the 2012 Summer Paralympics despite an infection and the doctor's bed-rest order, after sneaking out of the hospital.

Cai lost his eyesight when he was 10 years old, due to a medical accident involving an injection.

Personal life
Cai is married to goalball player Wang Shasha, who is also blind. The couple live in Hangzhou. He has a black Labrador guide dog named "Sanhao".

References

Male goalball players
1983 births
Living people
Sportspeople from Jiangsu
People from Yancheng
Paralympic goalball players of China
Paralympic gold medalists for China
Goalball players at the 2016 Summer Paralympics
Goalball players at the 2008 Summer Paralympics
Goalball players at the 2012 Summer Paralympics
Medalists at the 2008 Summer Paralympics
Paralympic medalists in goalball
Nanjing University alumni
Goalball players at the 2020 Summer Paralympics
21st-century Chinese people